Kathryn, Katherine or Catherine Bailey may refer to:

Kathryn Ann Bailey Hutchison (née Kathryn Bailey, 1943), US senator
Catherine Hayes Bailey (1921–2014), American plant geneticist
 Catherine Todd Bailey (born 1951), American ambassador
Katherine Bailey (born 1982), Australian swimmer